Viktor Sergeyevich Melantyev (born 2 June 1986) is a Russian sprint canoeist who has competed since the late 2000s. He won a complete set of medals at the 2009 ICF Canoe Sprint World Championships in Dartmouth with a gold in the C-1 4 × 200 m, a silver in the C-4 200 m, and a bronze in the C-2 1000 m events.

Melantev also competed in the C-1 1000 m event at the 2008 Summer Olympics in Beijing, but was eliminated in the semifinals.

External links
Canoe09.ca profile

1986 births
Canoeists at the 2008 Summer Olympics
Living people
Olympic canoeists of Russia
Russian male canoeists
ICF Canoe Sprint World Championships medalists in Canadian
Universiade medalists in canoeing
Universiade gold medalists for Russia
Canoeists at the 2020 Summer Olympics
Sportspeople from Krasnodar Krai